Noah Elliss (born March 31, 1999) is an American football defensive tackle for the Philadelphia Eagles of the National Football League (NFL). He played college football at Idaho and was signed by the Eagles as an undrafted free agent after the 2022 draft.

Early life and high school career
Elliss grew up in Highlands Ranch, Colorado and attended Valor Christian High School where he registered 104 tackles, 27 tackles for loss, 11.5 sacks, and one forced fumble in two seasons.

College career
Elliss was rated a four-star recruit and committed to play college football at Mississippi State. Elliss was later ruled academically ineligible to play college football, and after the departure of Mississippi State's defensive line coach, Brian Baker, he opted to enroll at the University of Idaho, where his father was coaching. Elliss was not eligible to play for the Vandals until 2019. He suffered a torn ACL and a torn MCL early in his first season playing. Elliss played in all six of the Vandals' games during his redshirt junior season, which was shortened and played in the spring of 2021 due to the COVID-19 pandemic in the United States. As a redshirt senior, he played in 10 games and finished the season with 46 tackles, 6.5 tackles for loss, one sack, and one fumble recovery. Following the end of the season, Elliss declared that he would be entering the 2022 NFL Draft.

College statistics

Professional career
On April 30, 2022 Ellis signed as an undrafted free agent with the Philadelphia Eagles following the 2022 NFL Draft. He was waived on July 26, 2022 and placed on the reserve/non-football injury list.

Personal life
Elliss's father, Luther Elliss, played defensive tackle in the NFL for 10 seasons. His two older brothers, Kaden and Christian, both played football at Idaho and currently play in the NFL.

References

External links
 Philadelphia Eagles bio
Idaho Vandals bio

1999 births
Living people
People from Highlands Ranch, Colorado
Players of American football from Colorado
American football defensive tackles
Idaho Vandals football players
Philadelphia Eagles players